The serra antwren (Formicivora serrana) is a species of small insectivorous bird in the family Thamnophilidae. It is endemic to the states of Rio de Janeiro, Espírito Santo and Minas Gerais in southeastern Brazil. The International Union for Conservation of Nature has assessed this bird's conservation status as being of "least concern."

There are three subspecies:
 F. s. serrana (Hellmayr, 1929) – east Minas Gerais and Espírito Santo
 F. s. interposita Gonzaga & Pacheco, 1990 – southeast Minas Gerais and northwest Rio de Janeiro
 F. s. littoralis Gonzaga & Pacheco, 1990 – coastal Rio de Janeiro (restinga antwren)

The restinga antwren (F. s. littoralis) has sometimes been treated as a separate species.

Description
Antwrens in the genus Formicivora have comparatively long tails, and the males are unusual in having underparts that are darker than the upperparts.
In the northern part of the range, the male bird resembles the black-bellied antwren, but the crown and upper parts are a richer, more chestnut colour and the edgings to the tertial feathers are rufous rather than white. It also shows less white on the flanks. In the southern part of the range, the crown and upper parts are dark brown, with an indistinct superciliary streak and less white on the wing coverts. The females of both races are also similar to the black-bellied female but have blacker cheeks and buff underparts. The song is a swiftly uttered series of up to twenty "cha" notes.

Distribution and habitat
This antwren is endemic to inland parts of southeastern Brazil, where its range includes the states of Minas Gerais, and adjacent parts of Rio de Janeiro and Espírito Santo. Its range was extended northwards in 2011 during an ornithological survey, by it being recorded at two sites some  farther north than its previous known range; the birds were found when they responded to recordings of vocalisations of the species. The precise distribution of many bird species in this area is poorly known and whether these birds were a separate population or whether they were part of a continuous distribution wherever suitable habitat existed is unclear.

Ecology
These antwrens usually forage in pairs, hopping purposefully and gleaning carefully among the foliage in thick shrubby vegetation. 
Like other antwrens, the diet consists mainly of arthropods; typically these include grasshoppers, crickets, cockroaches, stick insects and butterfly and moth larvae.

The population is thought to be in slow decline because of habitat loss but no specific threats have been recognised, and the International Union for Conservation of Nature has assessed its conservation status as being of "least concern".

References

Serra antwren
Birds of the Atlantic Forest
Endemic birds of Brazil
Serra antwren
Serra antwren
Taxonomy articles created by Polbot